Ridha Grira (born 21 August 1955) is a Tunisian politician.

Biography

Academic background 
Grira obtained his baccalaureate from lycée de garçons in Sousse, in June 1974. He then attended Lycée Louis-le-Grand, followed by École centrale Paris where he received a MPhil in Chemical Engineering in 1974. He concurrently studied Law, Economics and Management at the University of Paris 1 Pantheon-Sorbonne, Institut d'Études Politiques de Paris and Ecole Nationale d'Administration where he later graduated with honors.

Political career 
During his political career, M. Grira held several senior administrative positions at the Prime Ministry of Tunisia. In 1991, he was appointed CEO of the Banque Tuniso-Libyenne. He took on the role of General Secretary of the Government. On January 16, 1992, he was assigned the position of General Secretary of Foreign Affairs Ministry. On April 22, 1999, he was chosen as Minister of State Properties and Land Affairs. On 14 January 2010, he became the Minister of National Defense.

Post-revolution 
After the ousting of the Tunisian President Zine El Abidine Ben Ali during the revolution of 2011, Ridha Grira was reappointed by Prime Minister Mohamed Ghannouchi to his position within the « national unity government » formed by Mohamed Ghannouchi. This government was strongly opposed by the people due to its composition of prominent figures of the former regime and the Constitutional Democratic Rally. At that time M.Grira was the president of the Manar II (Tunis) unit a position he held since 1994.
As a result of the pressure from the protesters M. Grira resigned from Constitutional Democratic Rally party on January 20. Despite the continuous efforts by the new government, the protesters continued to voice their displeasure with its current members. As a result, M. Grira resigned from the government on January 27, 2011.

Awards and honors 
 Grand Cordon of the Order of the Republic
 Grand Cordon of the Order of 7 November

References

1955 births
University of Paris alumni
Sciences Po alumni
Government ministers of Tunisia
Living people
People of the Tunisian Revolution
Defence ministers of Tunisia